This is the list of world records progression in men's weightlifting. Records are maintained in each weight class for the snatch lift, clean and jerk lift, and the total for both lifts.

The International Weightlifting Federation restructured its weight classes in 1993, 1998 and 2018, nullifying earlier records.

55 kg

Snatch

Clean & Jerk

Total

61 kg

Snatch

Clean & Jerk

Total

67 kg

Snatch

Clean & Jerk

Total

73 kg

Snatch

Clean & Jerk

Total

81 kg

Snatch

Clean & Jerk

Total

89 kg

Snatch

Clean & Jerk

Total

96 kg

Snatch

Clean & Jerk

Total

102 kg

Snatch

Clean & Jerk

Total

109 kg

Snatch

Clean & Jerk

Total

+109 kg

Snatch

Clean & Jerk

Total

See also
 World record progression men's weightlifting (1998–2018)
 World record progression men's weightlifting (1993–1997)
 World record progression women's weightlifting
 World record progression women's weightlifting (1998–2018)

References

External links
IWF official website
World Record progressions

Men's weightlifting
World